Laura Miele (born June 9, 1969) is an American businesswoman who serves as the COO of Electronic Arts (EA), where she is responsible for the company's strategic planning framework. She was formerly Chief Studios Officer, a role she started in 2018. Under her tenure, the company has developed several games in the industry, including Battlefield, Star Wars, Need for Speed, The Sims, Bejeweled, Mass Effect, and the EA Sports portfolio.

Personal life
Miele was born in San Francisco and grew up in a residential area near Lake Tahoe. She got her start in games through an affinity for board games with family. While studying at the University of Nevada at Las Vegas, Miele simultaneously worked at architectural companies. Miele now lives in the Bay Area.

Career
In 1996, Laura Miele joined video game developer Westwood Studios as a project manager and then become the head of marketing for its parent company, Virgin Interactive, and when EA acquired Westwood in 1998, she stayed on to focus on developing advanced analytics for revenue forecasting.

Laura Miele hired a data analyst team known as "the Jedi," and directed them to build Electronic Art's first statistical regression models to study "sales trends, seasonality, and preorders". It took about two years to put the system in place.

Miele has held a variety of leadership roles during her tenure at Electronic Arts. As Chief Studios Officer, Miele has managed 6,000 staffers and thousands of contractors, in addition to overseeing EA's 25 studios. Laura Miele became known for incorporating the gaming community's feedback in her decisions on what games should be made, such as those related to skateboarding.

Prior to that, Miele served as executive vice president of global publishing, senior vice president of publishing, and when EA signed a 10-year deal with The Walt Disney Company in 2013, Miele became Star Wars general manager. She also served as senior vice president of global marketing and vice president of strategic planning.

Miele started a women's networking and mentorship group at Electronic Arts. Being interested in women's rights, she works for the representation of women in games.
Miele served on the board of the Silicon Valley Community Foundation and also leads the EA Women's Ultimate Team.

References 

Electronic Arts employees
Women corporate executives
Businesspeople from San Francisco
University of Nevada, Las Vegas alumni
1969 births
Living people